Punjab Breweries Workers Union, a trade union of brewery workers in Punjab, India. PBWU is affiliated to the All India Trade Union Congress. The president of PBWU is Gurbir Singh and the general secretary Kishan Chand.

References

Trade unions in India
All India Trade Union Congress
Food processing trade unions